Frontstreet is the debut mixtape by OFB with SJ, Bandokay and Double Lz. The mixtape was released on 14 November 2019 under Rattrap Reality; the name of the mixtape is derived from a part of the Broadwater Farm estate in Tottenham.

The mixtape peaked at number 36 on the UK Albums Chart and 97 on the Irish Albums Chart. The mixtape was certified silver by the British Phonographic Industry, as was the track "Ambush".

Reception
Thomas Gorton, writing for Dazed, wrote:

Track listing

Charts

Certifications

Awards and nominations

References

2019 mixtape albums
Debut mixtape albums